Diplodiscus hookerianus is a species of flowering plant in the family Malvaceae sensu lato or Tiliaceae. It is a tree endemic to Peninsular Malaysia.

References

hookerianus
Endemic flora of Peninsular Malaysia
Trees of Peninsular Malaysia
Endangered plants
Taxonomy articles created by Polbot